"All Apologies" is a song by American rock band Nirvana, written by vocalist and guitarist, Kurt Cobain. It appears as the 12th track on the band's third and final studio album, In Utero, released by DGC Records in September 1993. The song closes the American version of the album, while non-US versions of In Utero feature an additional song, "Gallons of Rubbing Alcohol Flow Through the Strip," which begins after approximately 20 minutes of silence on the same track.

On December 6, 1993, "All Apologies" was released as the second single from In Utero, as a double A-side with the song, "Rape Me". It was Nirvana's final single before Cobain's suicide in April 1994.

Although not released as a physical single in the US, "All Apologies" became the third Nirvana song to top the Modern Rock chart, and reached number 32 on the UK Singles Chart. It was nominated for two Grammy Awards in 1995, and was included on the Rock and Roll Hall of Fame's list of "The Songs That Shaped Rock and Roll".

Origin and recording

Early history
"All Apologies" was written by Cobain in 1990. In a 2005 interview with Wes Orshoski of Harp, Nirvana drummer Dave Grohl recalled that the song was "something that Kurt wrote on [a] 4-track in our apartment in Olympia. I remember hearing it and thinking, 'God, this guy has such a beautiful sense of melody, I can't believe he's screaming all the time.'" 

The song was first recorded in the studio by Craig Montgomery at Music Source Studios in Seattle, Washington on January 1, 1991. This version, described by music journalist Gillian G. Gaar as "having a more upbeat pop-folk sound" than later versions, featured bassist Krist Novoselic accompanying Cobain on guitar, playing seventh chords behind the guitar riff, and Grohl's drumming accented by a tambourine. "All Apologies" was first performed live at the Wolverhampton Civic Hall in Wolverhampton, West Midlands, England on November 6, 1991.

In Utero

The second and final studio version of "All Apologies" was recorded by Steve Albini at Pachyderm Studios in Cannon Falls, Minnesota in February 1993, during the recording sessions for In Utero. The song, at that point tentatively titled "La La La," was recorded on February 14, the second day of the sessions. 

The recording features cello by Kera Schaley, a friend of Albini's who at the time played in the Chicago band, Doubt. Schaley had initially been asked by Albini to compose a cello part for the song "Dumb," and after hearing what she had written, Cobain asked her to "play around with 'All Apologies.'" As she recalled in a 2010 interview with Swan Fungus, "Most of the cello on that was me just messing around and then Kurt had me learn one specific line that he wanted everyone to be playing the same thing on. I sort of thought they were going to scrap the cello on that one, but it stayed in." 

Albini was pleased with the recording, saying that he remembered "really liking the sound of that song as a contrast to the more aggressive ones" and that "it sounded really good in that it sounded lighter, but it didn't sound conventional. It was sort of a crude light sound that suited the band." In a 1993 Rolling Stone interview, Cobain told David Fricke that songs such as "All Apologies" and "Dumb" represented "the lighter, more dynamic" sound that he wished had been more prominent on previous Nirvana albums.

The band eventually elected to remix "All Apologies," along with  the album's lead single "Heart-Shaped Box," due to concerns that the vocals and bass were not loud enough in Albini's original mixes. In a 1993 Guitar World interview, Cobain explained to English journalist Jon Savage:

"[The quieter songs on In Utero] came out really good, and Steve Albini's recording technique really served those songs well; you can really hear the ambience in those songs. It was perfect for them. But for "All Apologies" and "Heart-Shaped Box" we needed more. My main complaint was that the vocals weren't loud enough. In every Albini mix I've ever heard, the vocals are always too quiet. That's just the way he likes things, and he's a real difficult person to persuade otherwise. I mean, he was trying to mix each tune within an hour, which is just not how the songs work. It was fine for a few songs, but not all of them. You should be able to do a few different mixes and pick the best."

The two songs were remixed by Scott Litt, chosen due to his work with American rock band R.E.M., in May 1993 at Bad Animals in Seattle, Washington. A third song, "Pennyroyal Tea," was remixed by Litt in November 1993, in preparation for its release as a single.
Novoselic defended the band's decision to remix "All Apologies" and "Heart-Shaped Box" by calling them "gateways" to the more abrasive sound of the rest of the album, and that once listeners played the record they would discover "this aggressive wild sound, a true alternative record".

According to Nirvana manager Danny Goldberg in his 2019 Cobain biography Serving the Servant, Cobain was "euphoric" after hearing Litt's mix of "All Apologies," the first of the two songs initially remixed.

Post-In Utero

On November 18, 1993, Nirvana performed an acoustic version of "All Apologies" during their MTV Unplugged performance at Sony Music Studios in New York City. This version of the song featured Pat Smear on second guitar and Lori Goldston on cello.

"All Apologies" was performed for the final time live at Nirvana's last concert, at Terminal Einz in Munich, Germany on March 1, 1994.

Composition
Cobain dedicated "All Apologies" to his wife, Courtney Love, and their daughter, Frances Bean Cobain, during the band's appearance at the Reading Festival in Reading, England on August 30, 1992. "I like to think the song is for them," he told Michael Azerrad in the 1993 biography, Come As You Are: The Story of Nirvana, "but the words don't really fit in relation to us...the feeling does, but not the lyrics." Cobain summarized the song's mood as "peaceful, happy, comfort – just happy happiness."

Release
"All Apologies" was released as a double A-side single with "Rape Me" on December 6, 1993, on CD, cassette tape, and 7-inch and 12-inch vinyl record formats. The only instruction Cobain gave the single's art director, Robert Fisher, regarding the packaging was that he wanted "something with seahorses". Like its predecessor "Heart-Shaped Box", the single was not released commercially in the United States. However, the song did peak at number one on the US Modern Rock Tracks Chart, remaining on the chart for 21 weeks and boosting sales of In Utero nationwide. In February 1994, "All Apologies" was voted in as the number one most wanted song by listeners of the Hawaii Free Radio.

"All Apologies" was nominated for a Grammy Award for Best Rock Performance by a Duo or Group with Vocal and Best Rock Song in 1995. "All Apologies" is also a BMI Award-winning song, for being the most played song on American college radio during the eligible period from 1994 to 1995.

Critical reception

Everett True of Melody Maker named "All Apologies" the magazine's "Single Of The Week," calling it "the most supremely resigned, supremely weary fuck you to the outside world I've heard this year," with "the most gorgeous, aching tune, an emotionally draining ennui." In his review of In Utero for Rolling Stone, David Fricke called the song a "stunning trump card, the fluid twining of cello and guitar hinting at a little fireside R.E.M. while the full-blaze pop glow of the chorus shows the debt of inspiration Cobain has always owed to Paul Westerberg and the vintage Replacements." Christopher John Farley of Time called it In Uteros "best song" and "a riddling, fitting ending to a great album."

Legacy

In 2004, Q ranked "All Apologies" first on their list of the 10 Greatest Nirvana Songs Ever. In 2005, Blender ranked it at number 99 on their list of The 500 Greatest Songs Since You Were Born. In 2011, it was ranked at number 462 on Rolling Stone's "500 Greatest Songs of All Time" list, moving down seven spots from its position in 2004, and  first on the NME's list of the Nirvana's 10 Best Tracks. Rolling Stone placed it at number 13 on their ranking of 102 Nirvana songs in 2015. In 2019, The Guardian ranked it second on their list of Nirvana's 20 greatest songs. In 2022, Pitchfork ranked it at number 140 on their "250 Best Songs of the 1990s" list, with Jayson Greene writing that its melody was "so simple it seems as though someone, somewhere, must always have been singing it." The same year, Pitchfork readers voted it the 39th best song of the decade.

On April 10, 2014, the song was performed by surviving Nirvana members Grohl, Novoselic and Pat Smear, with lead vocals by New Zealand musician Lorde, at Nirvana's Rock and Roll Hall of Fame induction ceremony at Barclays Centre in Brooklyn, New York. The performance also featured Annie Clark, Kim Gordon and Joan Jett.

The song is featured in the episode "All Alone" from the fifth and final season of the TV series Six Feet Under. On February 4, 2018, an instrumental version of the song appeared in a Super Bowl commercial for T-mobile. This version originally appeared on the 2006 album Lullaby Renditions of Nirvana, part of the Rockabye Baby! series of albums which reinterpreted songs by popular artists as lullabies, aimed towards infants. It also appeared in the 2015 Cobain documentary Montage of Heck, directed by Brett Morgen.

The song is included in the Rock and Roll Hall of Fame's unranked list of "The Songs That Shaped Rock and Roll," along with the band's 1991 breakthrough single, "Smells Like Teen Spirit."

Music video
MTV began airing the MTV Unplugged version of "All Apologies" as a music video shortly after the concert was taped, which coincided with the release of the song as the second single from In Utero in December 1993. Cobain was dismissive of this version, telling MTV in a 1993 interview, "I don't think ["All Apologies'"] was the best performance off the Unplugged thing. That's just my opinion. I don't think it was that good really. We played that song a lot better before." However, he explained that he had been too busy with touring to come up with a music video for the studio version.

According to comedian Bobcat Goldthwait, however, who opened for Nirvana at some shows during the In Utero tour, Cobain had shared his idea for an official "All Apologies" video that revolved around him being drunk at a party. Goldthwait suggested that Cobain perform the song dressed as Lee Harvey Oswald, singing into the camera while putting his rifle together in the Texas School Book Depository from which he assassinated American president John F. Kennedy. Cobain told Goldthwait that MTV didn't allow guns in music videos, so Goldthwait suggested he use a pie instead of a gun, with Novoselic or Grohl playing Kennedy and being hit by the pie in the back of their head. Goldthwait said Cobain was receptive to the idea, despite no video being made.

The MTV Unplugged "All Apologies" video was ranked at number seven on MTV's Top 100 Video Countdown of 1994. It also aired on MTV Europe.

MTV Unplugged version

In addition to being aired as the song's music video, the MTV Unplugged version of "All Apologies" was released as a promotional single in February 1994, and on the album MTV Unplugged in New York in November 1994.

In a February 1994 review of the song, Billboard wrote that "stripped to its basic elements, the song stands quite tall, and Kurt Cobain's rough-hewn vocal has many more shades and colors to enjoy. Already flooding rock radio, the task will be bringing this one to pop programmers—which seems like a distinct possibility". According to a Cashbox article published the same month, the Unplugged version was "enjoying ultra-heavy rotation, stoking radio interest in the song". The Unplugged version has reportedly gone on to receive more radio airplay than the studio version, and appears on both of the band's greatest hits albums, Nirvana (2002) and Icon (2010).

In 2014, Kyle McGovern of Spin called the Unplugged version "the definitive rendition" of the song, writing that "its power lies in those chilling cello lines; the candle-lit intimacy that can be felt even without watching the iconic performance footage; and that final mantra, gently sung by Cobain and Dave Grohl: 'All in all is all we are,' an epitaph equal parts puzzling, comforting, and devastating." In the magazine's 1995 review of MTV Unplugged in New York, Rob Sheffield wrote that the rendition "begins hesitantly, fingers tapping on strings in a brittle staccato, until Dave Grohl's elegantly brushed drums push Cobain into a terse valentine to a lover who has married him and buried him, a lover from whom he can't escape because after he'd tasted the joy of being easily amused, it hurts too much to go back to jaded detachment."

Formats and track listings
In Utero version
Released as a double A-side with "Rape Me".CD single and 12-inch vinylA. "All Apologies" – 3:50
A. "Rape Me" – 2:49
B. "Moist Vagina" – 3:34Cassette and 7-inch vinylA. "All Apologies" – 3:50
A. "Rape Me" – 2:49

MTV Unplugged in New York versionUS promotional CD single (released February 1994)
 All Apologies. (Unplugged version).
 All Apologies. (In Utero version).

Charts

Weekly charts

Year-end charts

Awards
Unplugged version

Certifications

Accolades

PersonnelNirvana Kurt Cobain – vocals, guitars
 Krist Novoselic – bass 
 Dave Grohl – drumsAdditional personnel'''
 Kera Schaley – cello

Other releases

The studio version recorded at Music Source Studios in Seattle on January 1, 1991 appeared on the "Deluxe" and "Super Deluxe" editions of the 20th anniversary version of In Utero, released in September 2013.
A boombox-recorded demo, featuring Cobain on vocals and guitar, appeared on the Nirvana box set With the Lights Out, released in November 2004. A sped-up version of the same recording appeared on the menu of the DVD included in the set. This recording was re-released on the compilation album, Sliver: The Best of the Box in November 2005. The demo is believed to have been recorded in 1992 or 1993.
The live version recorded at the 1992 Reading Festival in Reading, England appeared on Live at Reading, released in November 2009 on CD and DVD.
Albini's original mix of the Pachyderm version was released on the 20th anniversary "Deluxe" and "Super Deluxe" versions of In Utero. The re-issue also included a remix by Albini, done in 2013.
A live version, recorded at Pier 48 in Seattle, Washington on December 13, 1993 for MTV, was released on the live video Live and Loud'' in September 2013.

Cover versions

References

Bibliography

External links

1993 singles
Nirvana (band) songs
Songs written by Kurt Cobain
Song recordings produced by Steve Albini
DGC Records singles
1993 songs
1990s ballads
Alternative rock ballads